James Beverly Owens (July 23, 1920 – November 2, 2009) was an American engineer and former executive.

Owens was born in Houston, Texas in July 1920. He attended Rice University and also studied at the Massachusetts Institute of Technology as well as the Westinghouse Advanced Electrical Design School. During World War II, he worked for Westinghouse as a designer for military radar technology. He later served as president of Gould-Brown Boveri, an electrical equipment distributor. He served as the president of the IEEE in 1983 as well as on the board of directors from 1981 to 1984. He received the IEEE Founders Medal in 1987 "for exemplary and inspirational leadership, distinguished service, and administrative excellence in electric power engineering and the electrical engineering profession". Owens died in Lincolnshire, Illinois in November 2009 at the age of 89.

References

1920 births
2009 deaths
Massachusetts Institute of Technology alumni
Rice University alumni
American engineers